The Nelson C. and Gertrude A. Burch House, (also known as the Smith House and Sandy House) is a historic house located at 115 West Atchison Street in Jefferson City, Cole County, Missouri.

Description and history 
It was built in 1869, and is a two-story, Italianate style brick dwelling on a stone foundation. It has a front gable roof and segmentally arched windows. Also on the property is a contributing garage.

It was listed on the National Register of Historic Places on January 8, 2003.

References

Houses on the National Register of Historic Places in Missouri
Italianate architecture in Missouri
Houses completed in 1869
Buildings and structures in Jefferson City, Missouri
National Register of Historic Places in Cole County, Missouri